Borba is a municipality in the state of Amazonas in northern Brazil.

Location

Its population was 41,748 (2020) and its area is 44,251 km². The city is the seat of the Territorial Prelature of Borba.

The municipality contains 46% of the  Rio Madeira Sustainable Development Reserve, created in 2006.
It contains about 10% of the  Matupiri State Park, created in 2009 along the Matupiri River.
It fully contains the  Matupiri Sustainable Development Reserve, created in 2009.
It contain 21% of the  Igapó-Açu Sustainable Development Reserve, also created in 2009.
Borba also contains about 60% of the  Acari National Park created by president Dilma Rousseff in 2016 in the last week before her provisional removal from office.

History
Founded in 1728 as the Jesuit mission Aldea Trocano by Portuguese Padre João Sampaio. In 1755, it became the first vila (Portuguese town) in what was then the new captaincy of Rio Negro, named Borba.

Economy
The economy of Borba depends largely on fishing, agriculture, and extractive activities like rubber extraction and cocoa harvesting.

The city is served by Borba Airport.

References

Municipalities in Amazonas (Brazilian state)